The 1915 Çanakkale Bridge, is a road suspension bridge in the province of Çanakkale in northwestern Turkey. The bridge was officially opened by President Recep Tayyip Erdoğan on 18 March 2022 after roughly five years of construction. The year "1915" in the official Turkish name honours an important Ottoman naval victory against the navies of the United Kingdom and France during World War I.

It is the centrepiece of the planned   Kınalı-Balıkesir Motorway, which will connect the O-3 and O-7 motorways in East Thrace to the O-5 motorway in Anatolia.

The bridge is the first fixed crossing over the Dardanelles and the sixth one across the Turkish Straits, after three bridges over the Bosphorus and two tunnels under it.

Design and cost
The bridge's tender project was designed by Tekfen Construction and Installation and detailed designed by COWI A/S   and PEC (Pyunghwa Engineering Consultants in South Korea, for cable design and approach bridge design packages only). Arup and Aas-Jakobsen participated in the project as Independent Design Verifier (IDV). The Administrator consultants are Tekfen and T-ingénierie.

Internationally, the bridge is the second tallest bridge in the world, surpassing the Pingtang Bridge in China. The deck carries six lanes of motorway (three in each direction), together with two walkways on each side for maintenance.

According to President Erdoğan, the bridge cost 2.5 billion euros (2.7 billion US dollars) to build, but would save €415 million ($458 million) per year from a reduction of fuel consumption and carbon emissions.

History
Proposals for a bridge spanning the Dardanelles Strait have existed since the 1990s. A bridge was proposed again in 2012, and in 2014, it was placed in the Turkish government's future transportation projects list. In September 2016, the government officially launched the bridge building project. Bids for the contract to construct the bridge were made in 2017. The contract was awarded to a consortium containing Turkish companies Limak Holding and Yapı Merkezi, alongside South Korean companies DL Holdings and SK Ecoplant.

Construction began in March 2017. The bridge was initially scheduled for completion in September 2023, and later brought forward to March 2022. On 16 May 2020, the second tower was completed, on the Gallipoli side (European coast). By 13 November 2021 all block decks were installed. The toll bridge opened for traffic on 18 March 2022, with a toll price of 200 lira (€13.60).

A Chinese Consul General Zhang Meifang uploaded a video to social media on 13 Feb 2023 that inaccurately claimed the bridge in Turkey withstood the recent devastating earthquake thanks to Chinese technology. Zhang wrote, "The bridge built by China in Turkey’s withstood the earthquake #ChinaTech." She also falsely claimed that "a subsidiary of Shudao Group is the sole participant in the construction." The bridge was also unlikely to be in any danger from the devastating magnitude 7.8 earthquake that struck Turkey's southeastern provinces on 6 Feb 2023, as it is located approximately 950 kilometers (590 miles) northwest from Kahramanmaras, the city closest to the quake's epicenter.

Symbolism
Some symbolic figures are associated with the bridge:

 the number 1915 in the name,
 the height of intersection point of main cable (318 m),
 and the opening date (18 March),

are all related to the date of the Ottoman naval victory, on 18 March 1915, during the naval operations in the Gallipoli campaign.
Meanwhile, the length of the bridge's main span (2,023 metres) refers to the centennial of the Turkish Republic (1923–2023).

Gallery

Comparison of notable bridges

See also

Osman Gazi Bridge
Istanbul Canal
Other crossings of the Turkish Straits:
Bosphorus Bridge
Eurasia Tunnel, undersea tunnel, crossing the Bosphorus for vehicular traffic, opened in December 2016
Fatih Sultan Mehmet Bridge
Great Istanbul Tunnel, a proposed three-level road-rail undersea tunnel
Marmaray Tunnel, undersea rail tunnel connecting the Asian and European sides of Istanbul
Yavuz Sultan Selim Bridge
Xerxes' Pontoon Bridges, an ancient attempted crossing at a similar location (480 BC)

Notes

References

External links
 Official website
Çanakkale 1915 Bridge  at Daelim web site

2022 establishments in Turkey
Bridges completed in 2022
Buildings and structures in Çanakkale Province
Dardanelles
Gallipoli Peninsula
Gelibolu District
Lapseki District
Road bridges in Turkey
Suspension bridges in Turkey
Toll bridges in Turkey
Transcontinental crossings
Transport in Çanakkale Province